Andrew J. Delmore (born December 26, 1976) is a Canadian former professional ice hockey defenceman. Delmore played 283 games in the National Hockey League (NHL), recording 43 goals and 58 assists for 101 points. He was considered an offensive defenceman, valued for his proficiency on the power play. He is currently an assistant coach with the Windsor Spitfires of the OHL.

Playing career
A 6'0" defenceman, Delmore played junior hockey for the North Bay Centennials and later for the Sarnia Sting of the Ontario Hockey League (OHL). He went undrafted in 1997 and signed as a free agent with the Philadelphia Flyers, making his NHL debut during the 1998–99 season. Delmore was the first rookie defenceman to record a hat-trick in the playoffs. He also scored the overtime winner in Game 3 of the 2000 Eastern Conference Semifinals as Philadelphia defeated the Pittsburgh Penguins, 4–3. While playing for the Nashville Predators during the 2002–03 NHL season, he tied Sergei Gonchar and Nicklas Lidström for most goals (18) by a defenseman.

Delmore was traded twice on March 9, 2004; the Sabres first traded him to the San Jose Sharks (along with Curtis Brown) for Jeff Jillson and a ninth-round draft pick, and he was then traded to the Boston Bruins for future considerations. He did not see any game action for Boston through the end of the season. During the 2004–05 NHL lockout, Delmore played in Germany with Adler Mannheim of the Deutsche Eishockey Liga (DEL).

Delmore signed with the Detroit Red Wings to a one-year contract on August 16, 2005. However, he did not play a regular season game for the club and was claimed by the Columbus Blue Jackets off waivers on October 4, 2005. Delmore played the majority of the 2005–06 season for the Syracuse Crunch of the American Hockey League (AHL), playing only seven games in the NHL. He won the Eddie Shore Award as the top defenceman in the AHL and was named to the AHL First All-Star Team.

On July 1, 2006, Delmore signed a one-year contract with the Tampa Bay Lightning. He was then assigned to their AHL affiliate, the Springfield Falcons, to start the 2006–07 season. After 47 games with the Falcons, Delmore was traded by the Lightning (along with André Deveaux) to the Atlanta Thrashers in exchange for Kyle Wanvig and Stephen Baby on February 1, 2007.

Delmore returned to Germany when he signed a two-year contract with the Hamburg Freezers of the DEL on July 17, 2007.

After a two-year absence, Delmore returned to North America for the 2009–10 season when the Detroit Red Wings again signed Delmore to a one-year contract on July 28, 2009. Delmore was then assigned to their AHL affiliate, the Grand Rapids Griffins. On March 3, 2010, he was traded to the Calgary Flames in exchange for Riley Armstrong. He was then assigned to Flames' AHL affiliate, the Abbotsford Heat.

On October 24, 2010, Delmore left again for Europe to sign a one-year contract with Norwegian team Lørenskog IK. Delmore spend the following two seasons amongst the Austrian Hockey League and Italian Serie A before announcing his retirement at the conclusion of the 2012–13 season.

Awards
1996–97 – OHL First All-Star Team
2005–06 – AHL First All-Star Team
2005–06 – AHL Eddie Shore Award

Records
 Holds Philadelphia Flyers record for most goals (5) by a defenceman in a playoff season (1999–2000)
Only rookie defenceman to score a hat-trick in the playoffs, achieving the feat on May 7, 2000. Also the only Flyer defenceman to score a hat-trick in a playoff game.

Career statistics

References

External links

 

1976 births
Living people
Abbotsford Heat players
Adler Mannheim players
Bolzano HC players
Buffalo Sabres players
Canadian ice hockey defencemen
Canadian people of British descent
Chicago Wolves players
Columbus Blue Jackets players
Fredericton Canadiens players
Grand Rapids Griffins players
Graz 99ers players
Hamburg Freezers players
Ice hockey people from Ontario
KHL Medveščak Zagreb players
Lørenskog IK players
Nashville Predators players
North Bay Centennials players
People from Essex County, Ontario
Philadelphia Flyers players
Philadelphia Phantoms players
Rochester Americans players
Sarnia Sting players
Ritten Sport players
Springfield Falcons players
Syracuse Crunch players
Undrafted National Hockey League players
Canadian expatriate ice hockey players in Austria
Canadian expatriate ice hockey players in Croatia
Canadian expatriate ice hockey players in Norway
Canadian expatriate ice hockey players in Italy
Canadian expatriate ice hockey players in Germany